Flora Minnie Leone Bagnall,  (July 20, 1933 – April 30, 2017) was a farmer, teacher and former member of the Legislative Assembly of Prince Edward Island.

She was first elected to the Legislative Assembly of Prince Edward Island in the 1979 provincial election, representing the 1st Queens district. She was re-elected in 1982, 1986 and 1989. She was appointed Minister of Education from October 28, 1982 to May 2, 1986. Following the party's defeat in the 1986 provincial election, she briefly served as the interim leader of the Progressive Conservative Party of Prince Edward Island from 1987 to 1988.

In 1994 she was made a Member of the Order of Canada and was awarded the Order of Prince Edward Island in 2005. She also received the Queens Diamond Jubilee medal in 2002.

Bagnall died in Charlottetown on April 30, 2017, at age 83.

References

External links
 Order of Prince Edward Island Recipients
 Prince Edward Island: Women in Prince Edward Island Politics

1933 births
2017 deaths
People from Queens County, Prince Edward Island
Women MLAs in Prince Edward Island
Progressive Conservative Party of Prince Edward Island MLAs
Members of the Order of Canada
Members of the Order of Prince Edward Island
Female Canadian political party leaders
Progressive Conservative Party of Prince Edward Island leaders
Members of the Executive Council of Prince Edward Island
Women government ministers of Canada